Ulekchin (Ülegshen) is a rural locality (a selo) in Zakamensky District, Republic of Buryatia, Russia. The population was 1,180 as of 2010. There are 10 streets.

Geography 
Ulekchin is located 86 km east of Zakamensk (the district's administrative centre) by road. Kharatsay is the nearest rural locality.

References 

Rural localities in Zakamensky District